Burton F. Becker was the police chief of Piedmont, California in the early 20th century and  Kailiff of Ku Klux Klan No. 9 in Oakland, California.  He was elected Sheriff of  Alameda County in 1926. As sheriff, Becker offered protection to illegal gambling operators and bootleggers in exchange for bribes.  In 1930, after years of investigation by Alameda County District Attorney Earl Warren, he was tried and convicted on corruption charges, removed from office and sent to San Quentin Prison. After serving time in San Quentin, he was paroled in February of 1934 and pardoned by California Governor Frank Merriam in 1936.

References

Year of birth missing
Year of death missing
People from Piedmont, California
American police chiefs
American Ku Klux Klan members
Alameda County sheriffs
Criminals of the San Francisco Bay Area
20th-century American criminals
California politicians convicted of crimes